Toverit Helsinki (Finnish Helsingin toverit, 'Comrades of Helsinki') was a sports club in Helsinki, Finland, which was founded in 1916. Its history ended in 1970.

The club was founded in 1916 by group of athletes who left NMKY Helsinki.

The club was most based in the neighbourhoods of Vallila and Hermanni. Its sports included football, ice hockey, boxing, orienteering and athletics.

The club won the Finnish championship in football in 1942, although a regular league type competition could not be played due to the war, and the whole competition consisted of two cup rounds with a total of three matches. After 1942 their success in football faded due to part of the footballers went off to found a new club called Kallion Palloseura.

The club won bronze in football in 1934, 1935 and 1939.

Veikko Pakkanen and Viljo Huuska were among the sportsmen who founded the orienteering competition Jukola relay in 1948. The club was one of the organisers of the first two events in 1949 and 1950.

Beginning in 1923, the club participated in the pesäpallo (“Finnish baseball”) Finnish Championship Series, achieving a bronze in that season.

In the 1950s and 1960s the club was active in youth work in ski jumping in the Helsinki area.

Achievements

Season to Season

References

Defunct football clubs in Finland
Toverit Helsinki
Association football clubs disestablished in 1962
Football clubs in Helsinki
1916 establishments in Finland
1962 disestablishments in Finland